WRIX (1020 AM, "Electric City Bluegrass") is a daytime-only Bluegrass radio station located near Anderson, South Carolina. The station is licensed by the Federal Communications Commission (FCC) to the nearby community of Homeland Park and broadcasts on 1020 AM with a power of 10,000 watts during the day and 3,000 watts during critical hours.

History
WRIX signed on the air September 1, 1986 as the AM sister to WRIX-FM 103.1 (now WHQA). WRIX & WRIX-FM were founded by the late Matt Phillips. Tom Ervin purchased WRIX in 2013. The Matt & Bev Show was a popular morning show which aired weekdays from 8am. to 11am. Local musicians Bob Eidson, Jimmy Gilstrap and blues artist Kip Anderson also had shows on Wrix & Wans. Several other talk shows such as George Duckworth and morning favorite show host Michael Branch "Pork Chop" would soon follow.

References

External links
 Official Website
 

RIX
RIX